Brittany Lange (born December 31, 1986) is an American college basketball coach who recently served as the head women's basketball coach at Omaha from 2013 until 2020.

Creighton and Iowa State 
Lange initially enrolled at Creighton University, but after her freshman year (2005–06), she transferred to Iowa State. Due to injuries, she had limited minutes. Her head coach, Bill Fennelly, persuaded her to remain with the team as a student coach. She served in this position for her final two years at Iowa State.

Coaching career 
Brittany spent one season as a graduate assistant coach at St. Edward's in Austin, Texas. Following that season in 2011, she came to Omaha, and initially as Director of Basketball Operations and then as an assistant coach. When the head coach resigned, she was initially named the interim head coach, and then, in December 2013, at the age of 26, was named head coach, one of the youngest head coaches in the country.

Head coaching record
Lange's head coaching record is:

References

1986 births
Living people
Basketball coaches
Basketball players from Iowa
American women's basketball coaches
Omaha Mavericks women's basketball coaches
Guards (basketball)